Signmark is the first album from Signmark, a deaf Finnish rapper. The album was the first hip-hop DVD that was written in a sign language.

Track listing
 "Tuu Viittoo"
 "Nyt On Aika Juhlia"
 "Kahleet"
 "Carl Oscar Malm"
 "Maahan Lämpimään"
 "Meidän Elämä"
 "Our Life"
 "Sanaliitto"

See also 

 Carl Oscar Malm

References

2006 debut albums